Latitude is a geographical term denoting the north–south angular location of a place on the Earth or other celestial bodies.

Latitude may also refer to:
Science and geography
 History of latitude measurements
 Celestial latitude
 Paleolatitude, a term used for paleomagnetism
 Latitude Margaritaville, a retirement village in Daytona Beach, Florida

Technology and business
 Dell Latitude, a brand of laptop computer from Dell
 Exposure latitude, a photographic term pertaining to over/underexposure of film
 Google Latitude, a location-aware tracking application for mobiles developed by Google
Latitude Financial Services, an Australian and New Zealand financial services company
 Renault Latitude, a car

Entertainment
 Latitude Festival, a music festival in Suffolk, England
 Latitudes (film), a 2014 Brazilian film
 Latitude, a musical group made up of Craig Peyton and Benjamin Verdery, active ca. 1986

See also
 Lattitude Global Volunteering, British programme for youth volunteering